Gibilisco is a surname. Notable people with the surname include:

Giuseppe Gibilisco (born 1979), Italian coach and former pole vaulter
Joe Gibilisco (born 1954), Italian former professional boxer 
Laura Gibilisco (born 1986), Italian hammer thrower
Stan Gibilisco (1955-2020), American nonfiction writer